Abortion Rights may refer to:

Abortion Rights (organisation)
Abortion-rights movements
Abortion debate